The 2022 AIHL season is the delayed 21st season of the Australian Ice Hockey League (AIHL), following the cancellation of the 2020 and 2021 seasons. The season will consist of 60 regular season games and is scheduled to run from 30 April to 28 August 2022, with the Goodall Cup finals, consisting of 2 semi-finals, a preliminary final and a grand final, following the regular season on 2–4 September 2022. The CBR Brave won the double and claimed the H Newman Reid Trophy for a third time and Goodall Cup for a second time in 2022 by finishing top of the regular season standings and winning the AIHL grand final. The Newcastle Northstars were runner's up to both titles and the Sydney Ice Dogs claimed the wooden spoon.

Teams
In 2022 the AIHL had planned for 8 teams to be competing in the league when the season was announced. However, the Perth Thunder had to withdraw due to ongoing Western Australia border restriction challenges. Adelaide Adrenaline followed the Thunder in withdrawing from the 2022 season following failed protracted negotiations with the ice rink in Adelaide, leaving the team homeless in 2022. This left the league with six teams competing in the regular season in 2022. Two expansion teams, plus the Thunder, announced they would play exhibition games in 2022.

League business

The AIHL made the announcement that the league would return for a regular season and finals for 2022 on 6 December 2021, ending two years of cancelled competition and exhibition series'. The 2022 fixture list and finals schedule was released publicly by the AIHL on 8 February 2022. Melbourne would return as the host city of the AIHL Finals in 2022, after Newcastle hosted the 2019 edition. The League champion will be awarded the Goodall Cup, while the League Premiers will be awarded the H Newman Reid Trophy title. On 8 April 2022, the AIHL released a revised season schedule that did not change any dates but replaced Adrenaline and Thunder regular season fixtures with exhibition games involving the Rhinos, Lightning and Thunder.

The league made a number of key announcements in February in the lead up to the 2022 season start. Firstly, the AIHL would implement a game day format change it first flagged in 2020, which would bring the AIHL into line with international hockey standards. Game lengths would be increased from 50 minutes to 60 minutes with all three period lengths standardised to 20 minutes each. Previously the first two periods in the AIHL would be 15 minutes long with only the third period lasting 20 minutes. Secondly, the AIHL announced the expansion of domestic and international broadcasting of the league. Within Australia, more matches would be made available through partner broadcaster Kayo Sports, expanding on previous deals that included one game a round on delay. AIHL.TV would also provide an alternative platform for streaming content from the league. Internationally, the AIHL secured a deal with US-based Synergy Sports to deliver live streaming of AIHL games to the US, Canadian, United Kingdom and European markets. Thirdly, the AIHL will be setting up a new national community partnership to help showcase elite hockey in Australia. Lastly, the AIHL concluded the expression of interest process to find a new Licensee for the Adelaide Adrenaline license, following former holders, the South Australian Ice Sports Federation, relinquishing the license at the conclusion of the 2019 season. The League began the search in October 2021 and concluded five months later in February 2022 by announcing Benny Gebert and Glen Foll as the successful bidders for the license.

In March, the AIHL announced it had signed a three-year deal with Swiss-based Sportradar to become the league's global distributor of game streams and media rights. This superseded the previous announcement with Synergy Sports as Synergy was acquired by Sportradar In March 2022.  As part of the deal, Sportradar would also supply AIHL teams with video and data analytical services. In addition, the league released details of a new finals format for 2022. The finals format would be expanded from two to three days with the semi-finals now formatted into major (1v2) and minor (3v4) games and an additional game, the preliminary final, would be added to the schedule on the middle day. The winner of the major semi-final automatically advances to the grand final, while the losing team plays-off against the winner of the minor semi-final in the preliminary final. It means the teams finishing third and fourth in the regular season will be required to play at least two games to reach the grand final and compete for the Goodall Cup.

Expanding on the league's earlier announcement from February, in late April 2022, the AIHL revealed further details around the Kayo Sports domestic broadcasting deal for the 2022 season. Every game of the AIHL regular season, all 60, would be streamed live, free and exclusive on Kayo Sports. This would be the first time the league would broadcast every game of the season. In July 2022, the AIHL and Ice Hockey Australia jointly founded a new Best and Fairest Award for all Australian national championships starting in 2022 including, Sydney Tange, Kurt Defris, Phillip Ginsberg, Jim Brown and Women's championships.

In June, the AIHL entered into a new partnership with Workplace Law. The agreement with the specalised law firm, would deliver the AIHL a partner for legal advice and support across governance and constitutional matters, employment issues, tribunal/disciplinary matters, sponsorship and broadcast arrangements and competition matters.

Interruptions

When the 2022 season was announced by the AIHL, it was indicated that all eight current AIHL teams would participate. The AIHL in February 2022 released the regular season schedule and it contained fixtures for all eight teams, home and away. In response to the schedule, the Perth Thunder released a public statement on 12 February 2022, confirming the current Western Australian border restrictions presented challenges for the team to participate in the 2022 season, but the team would continue to dialog with stakeholders and hope for a resolution from the state government. On 18 February 2022, the Thunder in conjunction with the AIHL announced the team would not participate in the 2022 AIHL season due to uncertainty of when the WA border would open again and the limited time left to organise the team and travel prior to the 2022 season kicking off. The Thunder did offer the possibility of exhibition matches being played in Perth in 2022 to compensate for the unfortunate situation for its players, staff, fans and sponsors.

Adelaide Adrenaline's participation in the 2022 AIHL season has been caste in doubt with negotiations with Adelaide IceArenA, the only ice rink facility in Adelaide, breaking down. On 15 February 2022, IceArenA management released a signed letter with a list of accusations and grievances against the AIHL and ended the letter stating it would be difficult for the arena to support the AIHL. The Adrenaline deemed the subsequent draft agreement proposed by the IceArenA management for use of the facility for the 2022 AIHL season as non-equitable and unviable. On 27 March 2022, the Adrenaline officially withdrew from the 2022 AIHL season.

On 26 February 2022, the CBR Brave responded to an unconfirmed claim that they were looking to leave the AIHL, by confirming their status as an AIHL team and committing to the league and the 2022 season. Brave CEO, Sunny Singh, said the league had taken profound action in addressing key issues the Brave had heading into the 2022 season.

Two regular season games set to be played in Melbourne between the CBR Brave and Melbourne Mustangs were first postponed and later cancelled in July 2022. The games, scheduled for 2 and 3 July 2022, were postponed after flight cancellations at Canberra Airport left the CBR Brave stranded in Canberra and unable to fly to Melbourne for the double header against the Mustangs. Despite efforts to rebook both the Saturday and Sunday games were postponed on the Saturday. Both teams tried to reschedule the two games but ultimately were unsuccessful. On 30 July 2022 it was revealed the game were cancelled and both teams would share the six points on offer, three points each. The League confirmed the games were officially cancelled on 3 August 2022.

Expansion

Two teams decided against pursuing AIHL licenses in 2022. The Melbourne Ducks played exhibition matches against AIHL teams in 2021 but decided to join the new Pacific Hockey League in 2022. Joining the Ducks in the Pacific Hockey League is the Brisbane Rampage, who abandoned their strategic goal of obtaining an AIHL license in favour of joining the rival league. Ice Hockey Queensland (IHQ) subsequently decided to withdraw their endorsement of the Rampage and seek an AIHL license themselves in partnership with Brisbane Buccaneers and the Southern Stars. On 28 February 2022, IHQ was granted an AIHL license by the league commission. IHQ revealed their new AIHL team would play out of Boondall Iceworld and be called Brisbane Lightning. On 7 March 2022, it was reveled former AIHL team, Central Coast Rhinos, had made contact with the AIHL to obtain a new license and present their case for re-admission to the league. The Rhinos last played in the AIHL in 2008 before a licensing disagreement saw the team leave the league. They applied for re-entry in 2015, but were unsuccessful in their application on that occasion. On 10 March 2022, the AIHL made the decision to grant the Rhinos a new AIHL license, ending the team's 14-year hiatus out of the league. Central Coast will play out of their spiritual home, Erina Ice Arena, which went through major renovations and upgrades between 2019 and 2022. Both the Lightning and Rhinos will play exhibition matches in 2022 with a view for both to join the AIHL regular league schedule in 2023.

Exhibition games

The Brisbane Lightning, Central Coast Rhinos and Perth Thunder all announced in pre-season that they would be perusing to play exhibition games during the AIHL 2022 regular season. In total 29 exhibition games were scheduled in 2022, consisting of pre-season warm-ups, games with new teams and games with the Thunder during the regular season. Most games were announced with the release of the revised AIHL 2022 season schedule on 8 April 2022, however, the first exhibition series between the Sydney Bears and Newcastle Northstars was made public on 17 March 2022 and consisted of two pre-season match ups at Hunter Ice Skating Stadium in Newcastle and Macquarie Ice Rink in North Sydney. The team breakup of exhibition games for 2022 see the Lightning scheduled for 16 games, Bears 9 games, Rhinos 8 games, Northstars 6 games, Thunder, Mustangs and Ice Dogs 4 games, Ice 3 games and Brave 2 games. On 24 July 2022, the exhibition game between the Brisbane Lightning and Sydney Bears held as Iceworld Boondall in Brisbane was abandoned near the end of the second period follow an ugly high sticking incident. Subsequently, the AIHL Player Safety Committee concluded its investigation into the incident that led to the abandoned game and made the following ruling. The Brisbane Lightning player involved was suspended for 2+5 AIHL games (7 in total) and suspended from all Ice Hockey Australia national events until the suspension is completed in 2023. The Sydney Bears organisation was fined $3,500 for intentionally forfeiting the game.

Personnel changes

On 12 February 2022, the AIHL announced its new board of directors and key executives for 2022. The board comprises Garry Doré, Peter Jon Hartshorne, Wayne Hellyer and Joyce Price, with Hartshorne acting as chairman. Christine Bertolotti was appointed head of finance, Dawn Watt head of operations and Rob Duchemin head of referees & discipline.

There has been a number of franchise personal changes in addition to the league itself for 2022. These include a new executive team being appointed in February 2022 at the Sydney Bears. Nathan Graham became president and will be assisted by Andrew Bourne, Ruby Bray and Hamish Davey as vice presidents. Vanessa Saros takes over duties as Bears secretary. In March 2022, Adelaide Adrenaline appointed Glen Foll as new director of hockey operations and Benny Gebert as director of club operations, after the duo secured the operating license for the Adrenaline franchise from the AIHL.

There have also been a number of coaching changes for AIHL teams in 2022. The Sydney Ice Dogs lost Andrew Petrie, after he resigned in November 2021. He was replaced as head coach by former Czech player Ondrej Cervenka in March 2022. Adelaide Adrenaline and head coach Sami Mantere parted ways following the cancellation of the 2020 season. Mantere chose to sign for Adelaide Avalanche in March 2022 for the inaugural season of the Pacific Hockey League. Also in March, the newly formed Brisbane Lightning announced Terry Kiliwnik as their maiden head coach and Ivan Rapchuk as his assistant. In April, the Melbourne Mustangs appointed Canadian Chris Lawrence as head coach for 2022. This will be Lawrence's first head coach position as he comes off a long playing career in the AHL, ECHL and EIHL. The Mebourne Ice turned to a familiar long term servant of the club with their appointment of Sandy Gardner as head coach for 2022. This will be Gardner's third stint as head coach of the Melbournian club. He would be joined by fellow long term clubman Brent Laver as his assistant coach alongside newcomer Michael Flaherty, who joined the club with a CV including head coaching the Mustangs, Glaciers and Victoria. Canberra announced Stuart Philps would be retained as head coach for 2022, following his signing in the lead up to the cancelled 2020 season. Philps would be assisted by the returning Andrew Brunt, who had last coached the ACT team in the Brown Trophy in 2017 and had been the Brave assistant in 2015. Early in the season, Newcastle Northstars changed coaching staff responsabilities with Canadian Kevin Noble shifted to head coach and John Kennedy moved to assistant coach alongside Amelia Matheson.

Player transfers

Interclub transfers

* Mid-season transfer.

Retirements

New signings

Players lost

Regular season

Results

Fixtures

The 2022 regular season of 60 games, is scheduled to run from 30 April 2022 through to 28 August 2022, with each team playing 20 games. The top four teams qualify and advance to compete in the Goodall Cup finals weekend. The original schedule for 2022, consisting of 112 games had to be amended following the withdrawal of the Adrenaline and Thunder from the 2022 season, resulting in a reduction in the total number regular season games.

April

May

June

July

August

Standings

Skater statistics
2022 AIHL season top-ten skater statistics for points, goals, assists and penalty minutes.

Goaltender statistics
2022 AIHL season top-ten1 goaltender statistics for goals against average and save percentage.
1 Due to reduced regular season and competing teams in 2022, there were only 6 goaltenders who played 10+ games to qualify for these lists.

Awards

Skaters Network local player of the week
Every Tuesday the League, through sponsorship, names a local player of the week. 
The award is based on the following criteria: 
 individual performance, including significant game statistics;
 contribution to the team's success through individual leadership abilities; and
 performance off the ice, including community engagement.

Season awards

Below lists the 2022 AIHL regular season award winners.

Goodall Cup playoffs
The 2022 finals weekend will see the implementation of the new finals format, announced by AIHL in March 2022, for the first time. It is scheduled to begin on Friday 2 September with the major and minor semi-finals. On Saturday 3 September, the first ever AIHL preliminary final will take place, while the Goodall Cup final will be held on Sunday 4 September. Following the end of the regular season the top four teams advance to the finals weekend, which is to be held at O’Brien Icehouse in Docklands, Melbourne. This will be the ninth time the Icehouse has hosted the AIHL Finals. The series involves single game match-ups at all stages. The top two teams from the AIHL regular season play-off in the major semi-final for an automatic spot in the Goodall Cup final. The teams who finished third and fourth in the regular season play-off in an elimination game in the minor semi-final. The winner of the minor semi-final advances to the preliminary final to play the loser of the major semi-final. The winner of the preliminary final progresses to the Goodall Cup final and the loser is eliminated. The winner of the grand final is named AIHL Champion and lifts the historic Goodall Cup.

The Brave, Northstars, Bears and Mustangs qualified for the 2022 finals weekend. The Mustangs were the first team eliminated with the Brave progressing straight from the semi-finals to the Goodall Cup Final. The Northstars defeated the Bears with a golden goal in overtime in the first ever preliminary final to reach the Goodall Cup Final. The Brave won the grand final, defeating the Northstars, to lift the Goodall Cup for the second time in the team's history. Joey Hughes was named Finals MVP after the grand final. Hughes continued to extend his record as the most decorated player in AIHL history, winning his seventh Goodall Cup.

All times are UTC+10:00

Semi-finals

Preliminary final

Final

Trans-Tasman All-Star game
2022 was the inaugural season for the Trans-Tasman All-Star game between the champions of the AIHL and champions of the New Zealand Ice Hockey League (NZIHL). The game forms part of the Strategic Partnership Agreement signed between Ice Hockey Australia (IHA) and New Zealand Ice Hockey Federation (NZIHF) on 15 February 2022. Game was cancelled and replaced with a Trans-Tasman Challenge thee-game series between the Australian and New Zealand national teams, held at O'Brien IceHouse in Melbourne between 4 and 6 November 2022. Australia won the series 3–0.

All-star game

References

External links
The Australian Ice Hockey League
Ice Hockey Australia

2022 in ice hockey
2022 in Australian sport
2022